Fedra López (born June 5, 1962) is an Argentine actress and model.

Fedra was born in Buenos Aires, Argentina but raised up in Venezuela. She began her career at the age of 17 with Juan Carlos y su rumba flamenca. During a tour of Venezuela with her step-father, Fedra decided to stay in the country.

She has two children: a daughter Bebsabe and son Eros.

Filmography
 Natalia del Mar (2011) as Sara Morales vda. de Uzcategui (villain)
 El Desprecio as Pastora Lara Portillo (villain)
 Ser Bonita No Basta (2005) as Soledad Olavarría (villain)
 La invasora (2003) as María Teresa Aldana
 La mujer de Judas (2002) as Ricarda Araújo
 Felina (2001) as Mara
 Hechizo de Amor (2000) as Natasha
 Cuando Hay Pasion (1999) as Inés de Jesús Leal (protagonist)
 Aguamarina (1997)
 La Primera Vez (1997)
 Quirpa de Tres Mujeres (1996) as Manuela Echeverría Salazar (protagonist)
 Sol de Tentación (1996) as Katiuska 
 Ka Ina (1995) as Mireya Carvajal
 María Celeste (1993) as Irania Paniagua (villain)
 Rosangelica (1993) as Mariebla
 Por Amarte Tanto (1993)
 Inocencia mortal (1988)

References

External links

1962 births
Actresses from Buenos Aires
Argentine emigrants to Venezuela
Argentine telenovela actresses
Venezuelan telenovela actresses
Living people